Two ships of Bangladesh Navy carried the name BNS Surma:
 , an  gifted by Indian Navy.
 , a  currently in service.

Bangladesh Navy ship names